The 2005–06 season was Deportivo de La Coruña's 35th season in La Liga, the top division of Spanish football. They also competed in the Copa del Rey and the UEFA Intertoto Cup. The season covered the period 1 July 2005 to 30 June 2006.

Season summary

The season began with Deportivo searching for a new manager, following the departure of Javier Irureta after seven highly successful seasons. He was replaced by Joaquín Caparrós, who joined from Sevilla. Caparrós lead Depor to 8th in his first La Liga campaign, the same result as Irureta had achieved the previous year.

Greater success was to be had in cup competitions, as they reached the semi-finals of the Copa del Rey for the first time since 2002–03, before being defeated by eventual champions Espanyol. They also reached the final stage of the 2005 UEFA Intertoto Cup, where they lost to French side Olympique de Marseille.

Kit

Deportivo's kit was manufactured by Joma and sponsored by Fadesa.

Players

Squad
Retrieved on 31 March 2021

Left club during season

Squad stats 
Last updated on 30 March 2021.

|-
|colspan="14"|Players who have left the club after the start of the season:

|}

Competitions

La Liga

UEFA Intertoto Cup

Second round

Deportivo La Coruña won 4–2 on aggregate

Third round

Deportivo La Coruña won 4–0 on aggregate

Semi-finals

Deportivo La Coruña won 4–2 on aggregate

Finals

Olympique de Marseille won 5–3 on aggregate

See also
2005–06 La Liga
2005–06 Copa del Rey
2005 UEFA Intertoto Cup

References

External links 
  
Unofficial Spanish fansite 
Another unofficial Spanish fansite 
Official international website 
Official international forum 
Polish site 
Unofficial arabic fansite
Unofficial Turkey Fan 
Unofficial Russian Fan

Deportivo de La Coruna
Deportivo de La Coruña seasons